Mireya Aleshannee Delta Grey (born 7 September 1998) is an American-born Jamaican footballer who plays as a forward for Seattle Sounders Women and the Jamaica women's national team.

International career
Grey represented Jamaica at the 2018 CONCACAF Women's U-20 Championship. She made her senior debut in a 3–1 friendly win against Panama on 19 May 2019. She was a last minute replacement for injured Kayla McCoy taking her place at the 2019 FIFA Women's World Cup.

International goals
Scores and results list Jamaica's goal tally first

References

External links

1998 births
Living people
Citizens of Jamaica through descent
Jamaican women's footballers
Women's association football forwards
Jamaica women's international footballers
2019 FIFA Women's World Cup players
Pan American Games competitors for Jamaica
Footballers at the 2019 Pan American Games
Soccer players from Seattle
American women's soccer players
Washington Huskies women's soccer players
Seattle Sounders Women players
Women's Premier Soccer League players
African-American women's soccer players
American sportspeople of Jamaican descent
21st-century African-American sportspeople
21st-century African-American women